Supercuts is a hair salon franchise with more than 2,400 locations across the United States. The company was founded in the San Francisco Bay Area in 1975, by Geoffrey M. Rappaport and Frank E. Emmett. The company's first location was in Albany, California. The headquarters are in Minneapolis, Minnesota.  

Supercuts is a wholly owned subsidiary of Regis Corporation, which also owns Regis Salons, Mia & Maxx, MasterCuts, Cost Cutters, SmartStyle, and First Choice Haircutters in the United States and Canada.

The Supercuts salons in the United Kingdom are owned and operated by the Bushell Investment Group, a U.K. based private family office focused on investing in small and medium enterprise businesses, under a franchise agreement with Regis Corporation. 

There are separate stores in Australia.

References

External links

Hairdressing salon chains
American companies established in 1975
Retail companies established in 1975
Retail companies of the United States
Albany, California
1975 establishments in California

Companies based in Minneapolis